David Paul Maskinbak O'Connell (born June 3, 1940) is a North Dakota Democratic-NPL Party politician who represented the 6th district in the North Dakota Legislative Assembly from 1983 to 2016. He served as North Dakota Senate Minority Leader from 1989 to 2011, eventually stepping down from party leadership to spend more time with his wife, who was having health problems at the time. Before serving in the Senate, he was a member of the North Dakota House of Representatives from 1983 through 1988.

O'Connell serves on the board of directors for the North Central Electric Cooperative, and is a member of the Knights of Columbus. He lives in Lansford, North Dakota.

References

External links
David O'Connell in the North Dakota Legislative Assembly
Senator David Paul O'Connell (ND) profile at Project Vote Smart
Follow the Money – David Paul O'Connell
2006 2004 2000 campaign contributions
Senator David O'Connell North Dakota Democratic-NPL Party profile

Democratic Party North Dakota state senators
Minot State University alumni
1940 births
Living people
People from Bottineau County, North Dakota
Farmers from North Dakota
21st-century American politicians
Democratic Party members of the North Dakota House of Representatives